Belwa is a village in Jodhpur district of Rajasthan. It is 80 km away from the district headquarter.

References

Villages in Jodhpur district